M. G. Ramachandran (17 January 1917 – 24 December 1987), popularly known by his initials "MGR", was an Indian actor, director and producer who had an extensive career primarily in Tamil language films. After starring in numerous commercially successful films from the 1950s to the early 1970s, he has continued to hold a matinée idol status in Tamil Nadu. Ramachandran made his debut in Ellis R. Dungan's 1936 film Sathi Leelavathi, where he played a police inspector. He followed it with a string of minor appearances and supporting roles in many films, notably Ashok Kumar (1941), where he played the general of emperor Ashoka's army, and as a captain in Dungan's Meera (1945).

Ramachandran's breakthrough came with his first lead role in A. S. A. Sami's swashbuckler film Rajakumari (1947) where he played a villager who marries a princess. Based on the Arabian Nights, Rajakumari was a commercially successful venture. He established himself as an action hero akin to Errol Flynn and Douglas Fairbanks in Tamil cinema with Manthiri Kumari (1950) and Marmayogi (1951). Both films had political undertones which earned Ramachandran a Robin Hood persona of being a champion for the downtrodden. His performance as the caring brother Rajendran who tries to keep his family together in En Thangai (1952) earned him critical acclaim. In 1953, he made his debut in Malayalam films opposite B. S. Saroja in Genova. Ramachandran continued to play roles which enabled him to adopt his ideas of fighting injustice meted out to the poor such as an outlaw in Malaikkallan (1954), and Nadodi Mannan (1958). In the latter, he featured in dual roles, as a king and a commoner, for the first time in his career. Both Malaikkallan and Nadodi Mannan were commercially successful, becoming the highest-grossing films of their respective release years. In addition to social dramas, Ramachandran received positive feedback and commercial success for swashbuckler films such as Alibabavum 40 Thirudargalum (1956), the first South Indian full-length colour film, Madurai Veeran (1956), Chakravarthi Thirumagal and Mahadevi (both released in 1957).

According to Ashish Rajadhyaksha and Paul Willemen in the book Encyclopedia of Indian Cinema, the success of Ramachandran's 1961 film Thirudathe, marked a beginning of transition to roles that had "a contemporary setting". He often played "a saintly member of an oppressed class". The act of showering love and affection for his family members was a recurring theme in his films during this period. The films he appeared in during the 1960s played a crucial part in his subsequent career as a politician. The 1963 comedy-drama film Periya Idathu Penn had him play a farmer who seeks revenge from his village's zamindar. The following year, he appeared in Thozhilali as a bus conductor who exposes the fraudulent methods of a rival bus company, and in Padagotti as a fisherman who resolves to end the dispute between two fishing communities. In 1965, he collaborated with Tapi Chanakya in Enga Veettu Pillai, where he featured as twins of opposite natures, one a coward and the other courageous. He also featured in B. R. Panthulu's Aayirathil Oruvan the same year as a doctor who joins, and later becomes the leader of, a rebellion against a dictator. Both the films were major commercial successes. The romantic comedy Anbe Vaa (1966), where Ramachandran played an industrialist and was his only film under AVM Productions, is considered an antithesis of the roles he was doing during this period and was also commercially successful. He continued to achieve success at the box-office with films like Arasa Kattalai and Kaavalkaaran (both released in 1967), also garnering acclaim for the latter. Ramachandran's portrayal of twins, a club dancer and a criminal, who are separated as children in Kudiyirundha Koyil (1968) garnered him the Tamil Nadu State Film Award for Best Actor. In 1969, he appeared as a prince who brings down a tyrant who usurps his throne and mistreats his people in K. Shankar's Adimai Penn, and as a government clerk who masquerades as a billionaire to defeat the corrupt trio of a doctor, a builder and a merchant in Nam Naadu. The former won him the Best Film at the Tamil Nadu State Film Awards.

Ramachandran began the 1970s with roles in such social dramas as Mattukkara Velan and Engal Thangam (both released in 1970), both of which enjoyed commercial success. The following year, he received the National Film Award for Best Actor for his role as a cycle rickshaw driver in Rickshawkaran, making it the first film and him the first actor from South Indian cinema to win the award. It went on to become the highest-grossing film of the year. He then directed and produced the science fiction film Ulagam Sutrum Valiban (1973) where he also starred in dual roles as brothers, a scientist and a CBI officer. It became his most commercially successful film to that point. Ramachandran retired from filmmaking in 1978 to take up his duties as the Chief Minister of Tamil Nadu; his last venture, entitled Madhuraiyai Meetta Sundharapandiyan, was a commercial failure.

Films 

All films are in Tamil, unless otherwise noted.

See also 
 M. G. Ramachandran's unrealized projects

Notes

References

Bibliography

External links 
 

Indian filmographies
M. G. Ramachandran
Male actor filmographies
Director filmographies